Choi Byung-mo (born January 14, 1972) is a South Korean actor.

Personal life
On June 19, 2017, Choi got married with popera singer Kiriel Lee Gyu-in (birth name Lee Gyu-in) after one year and a half of dating, the wedding ceremony was held at a place in Gangnam, Seoul.

Filmography

Television series

Film

Theatre

References

External links
 at C9 Entertainment 

South Korean male television actors
South Korean male film actors
South Korean male stage actors
1972 births
Living people
21st-century South Korean male actors
South Korean television personalities